Sugawa Dam is an arch dam located in Nara prefecture in Japan. The dam is used for water supply. The catchment area of the dam is 124.2 km2. The dam impounds about 13  ha of land when full and can store 797 thousand cubic meters of water. The construction of the dam was started on 1959 and completed in 1969.

References

Dams in Nara Prefecture
1969 establishments in Japan